Merlin's Bridge is a village and a community south of, and contiguous with, Haverfordwest, Pembrokeshire, on the A4076 to Milford Haven.

Merlin's Bridge has its own elected community council which meets monthly, and is an electoral ward to Pembrokeshire County Council, electing one county councillor. The community had a population of 2,202 in the 2011 census.

The village has a community centre, a post office and a creamery.

Worship
The English Wesleyan Methodist Chapel, Emmanuel Christian Centre, and St Mark's Chapel, the three places of worship in Merlin's Bridge, are all buildings noted by the Royal Commission on the Ancient and Historical Monuments of Wales (Coflein).

Sport
The village's football team won The Senior Cup and League double in 2002. There is a boxing club.

War memorial
The marble War Memorial, sculpted by Edwards and Lewis of Haverfordwest, is at the end of Magdalen Street and can be viewed from Dredgman Hill.

References

External links
Historical information and sources on GENUKI

Villages in Pembrokeshire
Communities in Pembrokeshire
Pembrokeshire electoral wards